The Malaita white-eye (Zosterops stresemanni) is a species of bird in the family Zosteropidae. It is endemic to Malaita in the Solomon Islands.

References

IUCN 2008. 2008 IUCN Red List of Threatened Species. <www.iucnredlist.org>. Downloaded on 14 October 2008.

Malaita white-eye
Birds of Malaita
Malaita white-eye
Taxonomy articles created by Polbot